The ABA Robert Ridgway Award for Publications in Field Ornithology is an award given by the American Birding Association to an individual who has made significant contributions to the field ornithology literature in the areas of North American bird distribution and field identification. The award may honor a writer or an artist. 

One of five awards presented by the ABA for contributions to ornithology, the award is named in honor of Robert Ridgway, initiator of a monumental work of bird systematics, as well as one of the first color nomenclature systems for bird identification.

The award was first bestowed on Harold Mayfield.

List of recipients
Source:

See also

 List of ornithology awards

References

Ornithology awards
American Birding Association
Awards established in 2002